The Customs of Cambodia, also translated as A Record of Cambodia: the Land and Its People, is a book written by the Yuan dynasty Chinese official Zhou Daguan who stayed in Angkor between 1296 and 1297. Zhou's account is of great historical significance because it is the only surviving first person written record of daily life in the Khmer Empire. The only other written information available is from the inscriptions on temple walls.

Chinese original work
The book is an account of Cambodia by Zhou Daguan, who visited the country as part of an official diplomatic delegation sent by Temür Khan (Emperor Chengzong of Yuan) in 1296 to deliver an imperial edict. It is not certain when it was completed, but it was written within 15 years of Zhou's return to China in 1297.  However, the work that survives today is believed to be a truncated version, perhaps representing only around a third of the original size.  A 17th-century bibliophile, Qian Zeng (錢曾), noted the existence of two versions of the work, one a Yuan dynasty edition, the other included in a Ming dynasty anthology called Sea of Stories Old and New (古今說海, Gu jin shuo hai).  The Ming version was described as "muddled and jumbled up, six or seven tenths of it missing, barely constituting a book at all".  The Yuan dynasty original is no longer extant, and the surviving versions appear to be largely based on the truncated Ming version.

Texts from the book were collected in various other anthologies.  Excerpts were given in a lengthy compilation Boundaries of Stories (說郛, Shuo fu), in a second version was published in early Qing dynasty. Truncated text was also given in Lost Histories Old and New (古今逸史, Gu jin yi shi) from the Ming dynasty, and this same text was used in other collections.  A major modern Chinese versions of the book is an annotated edition, which was compiled by Xia Nai from variants of the text found in 13 editions, completed in 1980 and published in 2000.

The work is written in classical Chinese; however, there are occasionally words and sentence structures that appear to have been influenced by Zhou's Wenzhou dialect.

Translations

Zhou's account was first translated into French in 1819 by Jean-Pierre Abel-Rémusat but it did not have much impact.  The text of the book found in the anthology Sea of Stories Old and New was then retranslated into French by Paul Pelliot in 1902, and this translation was later partly revised by Pelliot and republished posthumously in 1951. Pelliot however died before he could complete the comprehensive notes he had planned for Zhou's work. Pelliot's translation is highly regarded and it formed the basis of many later translations into other languages, for example the English translations by J. Gilman d’Arcy Paul in 1967 and Michael Smithies in 2001. 

In 1971, it was translated into Khmer by Ly Theam Teng. There is also a Thai translation of The Customs of Cambodia by Chaloem Yongbunkiat in 1967, which has been reprinted by Matichon Press in 2014.

In 2007, Sino-linguist Peter Harris, a Senior Fellow at the Center for Strategic Studies New Zealand, completed the first direct translation from Chinese to modern English, correcting many errors in previous translated English versions, with a new title A Record of Cambodia: the Land and Its People. Harris worked in Cambodia for many years and included modern photographs and maps directly relating to Zhou's original account.

Content
The book gives descriptions of Yasodharapura, the capital city at the center of Angkor, and everyday palace life and protocols.  It describes the various customs and religious practices of the country, the role of women and slaves, trade and city life, agriculture, and other aspects of society in Angkor, as well as the presence of Chinese in Cambodia and the war with the Siamese. Also included are descriptions of the flora and fauna of the region, foodstuff, as well as unusual tales.

The descriptions in the book are generally considered to be accurate, but there are also mistakes, for example the local Hindu religious devotees were described erroneously by Zhou in Chinese terms as Confucians or Daoists, and the measurements of length and distance used are often less than exact.

On the Royal Palace:

On Khmer Homes:

On a royal procession of Indravarman III:

On the king's wardrobe:

On the dress:

On Silk production:

On judgment:

On the Army:

On the women of Angkor:

Calendar
Zhou's account is very useful for determining that the 1st month of the Khmer calendar was "kia-to", called Karttika. None of the Khmer inscriptions uses month numbering, but of the three systems used later in Thailand, Karttika was called month 1 in parts of Lanna and was also sometimes so numbered in Laos. The astronomical new year, on the other hand, began in what would have been numbered month 6 (Caitra). This equation is confirmed when Zhou Daguan says he does not understand why they intercalate only in (their) month 9. On the scale being used here the 9th month is Ashadha, the only intercalary month in Thailand and Laos. (Ashadha is better known as 'month 8' since that is its Southern (Bangkok) equivalence).

The use in Cambodia of Ashadha as the only intercalary month is not otherwise securely attested until the 1620s AD when a year (Saka 1539; IMA no. 9) is said to have a 2nd Ashadha when the old system did not have an extra month in that year. The inscription record between 1296 AD and 1617 AD is very patchy, but such records as survive from the first part of this interval appear to favour the older system of reckoning, suggesting that Zhou Daguan's informants were at the time of his visit in the minority.

Footnotes

External links

Book review by Cambodia Daily: A Record of Cambodia - The Land and its People, 2007 edition
Book review by Siam Society - A Record of Cambodia - The Land and its People, 2007 edition
Book review by New Zealand Journal of Asian Studies: A Record of Cambodia - The Land and its People, 2007 edition
Smithsonian Magazine - Passing Notes
Smithsonian Magazine - Jewel of the Jungle
“Trấn Tây phong thổ ký”: The Customs of Cambodia, Chinese Southern Diaspora Studies Volume 1, 2007

Chinese classic texts
Travel books
Books about Cambodia
13th-century Chinese books
Yuan dynasty literature
Chinese non-fiction books